The Committee on Budgetary Control (CONT) is a committee of the European Parliament. with 30 permanent members. It can be seen as the European Union's internal "political watchdog", seeking to identify undesirable developments within EU institutions and other bodies and then to elaborate constructive suggestions for improvement.

The committee's chair as of 2022 is Monika Hohlmeier.

Responsibilities of the committee
The Committee on Budgetary Control is responsible for the control of the implementation of the European Union's budget, meaning that the taxpayers' money is spent efficiently, effectively and according to EU law. In close cooperation with the Court of Auditors, it audits the accounts of EU institutions and suggests improvements in order to ensure sound financial management. It considers fraud and irregularities in the budget implementation, and suggests measures aimed at preventing and prosecuting such cases. In this context, it liaises with the union's Anti-Fraud Office OLAF to strengthen the fight against fraud and corruption.

The discharge procedure is the main tool at hand of the parliamentarians in the committee. During this procedure it scrutinises the implementation of the EU budget by all actors involved, i.e. inter alia the commission, Parliament, other institutions and agencies, on the basis of the yearly annual report of the European Court of Auditors. For this purpose, the committee organizes hearings to which it invites members of the examined bodies. The parliamentarians then transmit detailed questions about the activities and the performance of the respective proceeding working year (x, e.g. 2011). This process usually starts in October of the following year (x+1, e.g. 2012) and is then voted in the committee in March and in the Plenary in April of the next following year (x+2, e.g. 2013).

See also
European Court of Auditors
Santer Commission

References

External links

Budget of the European Union
Budgetary